Willard West Wood Jr. (born October 1, 1960) is an American professional golfer who has played on the PGA Tour, Nationwide Tour, and PGA Tour Champions.

Professional career 
Wood was born in Kingsville, Texas. He had an outstanding junior career, winning the 1977 U.S. Junior Amateur, the 1978 PGA Junior, and the 1979 Western Junior, and was named the 1978 AJGA Rolex Player of the Year. He attended Oklahoma State University in Stillwater, Oklahoma and was a star member of the golf team, where he played alongside Bob Tway, Scott Verplank, and Tommy Moore. He played in the 1983 Walker Cup. Later that same year joined the PGA Tour by being medalist at 1983 PGA Tour Qualifying School.

Wood has split his playing time between the PGA Tour and the Nationwide Tour. He has 23 top-10 finishes on the PGA Tour including a win at the 1996 Deposit Guaranty Golf Classic, and 12 top-10 finishes on the Nationwide Tour. His best finish in a major championship was T12 at The Masters in 1997.

Willie Wood and his wife Holly had two children. In October 1988 Holly Wood was diagnosed with breast cancer. She died ten months later.

After turning 50 in late 2010, Wood played his first Champion Tour event, the AT&T Championship, where he finished T13. He won the Dick's Sporting Goods Open at En-Joie Golf Club in Endicott, New York on August 19, 2012, by defeating Michael Allen on the first hole of a sudden-death playoff for his first victory on the Champions Tour.

Wood has a sister, Deanie, who was a member of the LPGA Tour. He makes his home in Edmond, Oklahoma and is a member of the "Oak Tree Gang", a group of touring professionals who all play at Oak Tree National in Edmond.

Amateur wins (3)
1977 U.S. Junior Amateur
1978 PGA Junior
1979 Western Junior

Professional wins (8)

PGA Tour wins (1)

PGA Tour playoff record (0–1)

Other wins (4)
1979 Nevada Open (as an amateur)
1984 Colorado Open
1990 Oklahoma Open
1995 Oklahoma Open

Champions Tour wins (2)

Champions Tour playoff record (1–0)

Results in major championships

Note: Wood never played in The Open Championship.

CUT = missed the half-way cut
"T" = tied

Results in senior major championships
Results not in chronological order prior to 2022.

CUT = missed the halfway cut
"T" indicates a tie for a place
NT = No tournament due to COVID-19 pandemic

U.S. national team appearances
Amateur
Walker Cup: 1983 (winners)

See also
1983 PGA Tour Qualifying School graduates
1992 PGA Tour Qualifying School graduates

References

External links

American male golfers
Oklahoma State Cowboys golfers
PGA Tour golfers
PGA Tour Champions golfers
Golfers from Texas
Golfers from Oklahoma
People from Kingsville, Texas
Sportspeople from Edmond, Oklahoma
1960 births
Living people